The Widnes Vikings competed in the Co-operative Championship in 2009. This was their first season under their new head coachPaul Cullen who replaced the outgoing Steve McCormack. Under Cullen's stewardship, Widnes managed to advance to the final of the Northern Rail Cup and ultimately won the cup, ensuring the club could apply for Super League membership in 2012.

Table

2009 Fixtures and results

Signings and transfers

2009 Signings

2009 Transfers

Squad

References

External links
 Vikings' official website

Widnes Vikings seasons
Widnes Vikings season